Charles Edison (August 3, 1890 – July 31, 1969) was an American politician, businessman, inventor and animal behaviorist. He was the Assistant and then United States Secretary of the Navy, and served as the 42nd governor of New Jersey. Commonly known as "Lord Edison", he was a son of Thomas Edison and Mina Miller Edison.

Early life

Charles Edison was born on August 3, 1890, at Glenmont, the Edison family home in West Orange, New Jersey. He was Thomas Edison's fifth child and second from his marriage to Mina Miller. He graduated from the Hotchkiss School in 1909.

In 1915–1916, he operated the 100-seat "Little Thimble Theater" with Guido Bruno. The theater staged the works of George Bernard Shaw and August Strindberg, and Charles contributed verse to Brunos Weekly under the pseudonym Tom Sleeper. Late in 1915, he brought his players to Ellis Island to perform for Chief Clerk Augustus Sherman and more than four hundred detained immigrants.

These avant-garde activities came to a halt when his father put him to work. For a number of years, Charles Edison ran Edison Records. Charles became president of his father's company Thomas A. Edison, Inc. in 1927, and ran it until it was sold in 1957, when it merged with the McGraw Electric Company to form the McGraw-Edison Electric Company. Edison was board chairman of the merged company until he retired in 1961.

Department of the U.S. Navy (1937–40)
On January 18, 1937, President Roosevelt appointed Charles Edison as Assistant Secretary of the Navy, then as Secretary on January 2, 1940, Claude A. Swanson having died several months previously. Edison himself only kept the job until June 24, resigning to run for Governor of New Jersey.

Governor of New Jersey (1941–44)
In 1940, he won election as Governor of New Jersey, running in reaction to the political machine run by Frank Hague, but broke with family tradition by declaring himself a Democrat.  As governor, he proposed updating the New Jersey State Constitution.  Although it failed in a referendum and nothing was changed during his tenure, state legislators did reform the constitution later.

Later political life
Between 1951 and 1969, he lived in the Waldorf-Astoria Hotel, where he struck up a friendship with Herbert Hoover, who also lived there. In 1962, Edison was one of the founders of the Conservative Party of New York State.

In 1967, Edison hosted a meeting at the Waldorf-Astoria in New York that led to the founding of the Charles Edison Youth Fund, later the Charles Edison Memorial Youth Fund. Attending the meeting were Rep. Walter Judd (R-MN), author William F. Buckley, organizer David R. Jones, and Edison's political advisor Marvin Liebman.  The name of the organization was changed in 1985 to The Fund for American Studies, in keeping with Edison's request to drop his name after 20 years of use.

Personal life
Edison married Carolyn Hawkins on March 27, 1918. They had no children.

In 1924, Edison joined the New Jersey Society of the Sons of the American Revolution.  He was assigned national member number 39,292 and state society number 2,894.

In 1948, he established a charitable foundation, originally called "The Brook Foundation", now the Charles Edison Fund.

Death

Charles Edison died on July 31, 1969, in New York City, three days shy of his 79th birthday. He is buried in Rosedale Cemetery in Orange, New Jersey.

See also

 List of governors of New Jersey

References

Further reading
 Richard J. Connors, State Constitutional Convention Studies, #4: The Process of Constitutional Revision in New Jersey: 1940–1947. (New York: National Municipal League, 1970).

External links
 
 New Jersey Governor Charles Edison, National Governors Association
 Charles Edison Fund: Includes a picture of Charles Edison
 The Pragmatic Populism of a Non-Partisan Politician: An Analysis of the Political Philosophy of Charles Edison
 Fund for American Studies – History

|-

|-

|-

|-

1890 births
1969 deaths
Governors of New Jersey
United States Secretaries of the Navy
People from West Orange, New Jersey
Hotchkiss School alumni
New York (state) Democrats
Conservative Party of New York State politicians
Charles
Franklin D. Roosevelt administration cabinet members
20th-century American politicians
American Presbyterians
New Jersey Democrats
Democratic Party governors of New Jersey
Burials at Rosedale Cemetery (Orange, New Jersey)
United States Assistant Secretaries of the Navy
American political party founders
New York (state) Republicans